Josef Ondřej Lindauer (29 November 1784, Plzeň – 5 June 1850, České Budějovice) was a Roman Catholic clergyman and bishop, who from 1845 to 1850 served as the third bishop of České Budějovice.

Life
He was ordained priest on 15 August 1807 in Prague and was nominated bishop by Ferdinand I of Austria on 22 September 1845, with confirmation from Pope Gregory XVI on 25 November, consecration on 18 January the following year in the Veitsdom in Prague and enthronement on 2 February.

References

Sources
http://www.catholic-hierarchy.org/bishop/blinda.html 
http://www.bcb.cz/Dieceze/Dieceze/Biskupove

1784 births
1850 deaths
People from Plzeň
Bishops of České Budějovice
19th-century Roman Catholic bishops in Austria-Hungary